Mont Saint-Quentin Australian war memorial, located in Mont Saint-Quentin region of Picardy, is an Australian First World War memorial.

The Australian Second Division has a war memorial on the road from Bapaume to Péronne. It is the only one of the five Australian division memorials initiated by members of the division. The base was erected in 1925. It has bronze bas-reliefs by May Butler-George of men hauling and pushing a gun and of men advancing with bayoneted rifles and hand-grenades. It had on its top an Australian soldier thrusting his bayonet through a German eagle. The sculptor was Charles Web Gilbert.

However, in 1940, German soldiers smashed the memorial. A replacement statue by Australian sculptor Stanley James Hammond (1913 - 2000) of a thoughtful Australian soldier looking down was erected in 1971.

See also

 List of Australian military memorials
 V.C. Corner Australian Cemetery and Memorial
 Villers–Bretonneux Australian National Memorial
 Military Memorials of National Significance in Australia

References

External links
History of the memorial (Australians on the Western Front) - includes a photograph of the current memorial

Australian military memorials
World War I memorials in France
Monuments and memorials in Somme (department)
Australian diaspora in Europe
Buildings and structures completed in 1925